Cosmosoma teuthras is a species of moth in the subfamily Arctiinae. It is found in Mexico, Guatemala, Costa Rica, Panama, Colombia, Venezuela and Brazil.

Subspecies
Cosmosoma teuthras teuthras
Cosmosoma teuthras cingulatum Butler, 1876 (Mexico, Guatemala, Costa Rica, Panama)
Cosmosoma teuthras restrictum Butler, 1876 (Brazil: Santarem)

References

teuthras
Moths described in 1854